Chrysomyxa pyrolae, is a species of rust fungi in the family Coleosporiaceae that can be found in such US states such as Alabama, Colorado, Maine and Vermont.

References

External links 

Fungal plant pathogens and diseases
pyrolae
Fungi of the United States
Fungi without expected TNC conservation status